Calliprora sexstrigella is a moth of the family Gelechiidae. It is found in North America, where it has been recorded from Arizona, California, New Mexico and Texas.

The wingspan is about 8 mm. The forewings are dark grey, the basal third light grey and a rather oblique white spot from the middle of the costa, triangularly expanded beneath, sending from the posterior angle a brown subcostal streak to join the next marking, beneath this spot an elongate white mark in the middle of the disc. There is an angulated white streak from the costa at three-fourths to the tornus, brown on the median third, the lower portion ochreous-tinged and confluent
with extremities of a V-shaped white mark preceding it, preceded also by a small whitish dorsal spot. There is a sinuate brown line from the costa at four-fifths to the apex, and a brown terminal line. Beyond this two pairs of small white black-edged wedge-shaped costal spots mostly in the cilia, the costal cilia otherwise pale grey, at the apex with a black projecting hook, on the termen with dark fuscous subbasal line and suffused dark fuscous on the outer half. The hindwings are grey, with a streak of pale suffusion in the middle of the disc.

References

Moths described in 1874
Calliprora